This is a list of wars involving the State of Kuwait.

References

Bibliography
 

 
Kuwait
Kuwait-related lists